The Fall of the House of Usher is an upcoming horror drama miniseries created by Mike Flanagan. Based on the short story of the same name and other works by Edgar Allan Poe, it is set to premiere on Netflix.

Cast 
 Bruce Greenwood as Roderick Usher, Madeline's twin brother
 Carla Gugino
 Mary McDonnell as Madeline Usher, Roderick's twin sister
 Carl Lumbly as investigator C. Auguste Dupin
 Mark Hamill as "a character surprisingly at home in the shadows"
 Samantha Sloyan
 Willa Fitzgerald
 Rahul Kohli
 Henry Thomas
 T'Nia Miller
 Kate Siegel
 Sauriyan Sapkota
 Zach Gilford
 Katie Parker
 Michael Trucco
 Malcolm Goodwin
 Crystal Balint
 Kyleigh Curran
 Paola Nuñez
 Aya Furukawa
 Matt Biedel
 Daniel Jun
 Ruth Codd
 Robert Longstreet
 Annabeth Gish
 Igby Rigney

Production

Casting 
On December 9, 2021, Frank Langella, Carla Gugino, Mary McDonnell, Carl Lumbly, and Mark Hamill were cast. Samantha Sloyan, Rahul Kohli, Henry Thomas, T'Nia Miller, Kate Siegel, Sauriyan Sapkota, Zach Gilford, Katie Parker, Michael Trucco, Malcolm Goodwin, Crystal Balint, Kyleigh Curran, Paola Nuñez, Aya Furukawa, Matt Biedel, Daniel Jun, Ruth Codd, Robert Longstreet, Annabeth Gish, and Igby Rigney were cast the next day. On April 13, 2022, Langella was fired from the series after a misconduct investigation, with his role set to be recast. At the end of April 2022, Bruce Greenwood was cast to replace Langella.

Filming 
Filming began on January 31, 2022, in Vancouver, Canada, and wrapped on July 9, 2022.

References

External links
 
 

American thriller television series
American horror fiction television series
Horror drama television series
English-language Netflix original programming
Television shows based on works by Edgar Allan Poe
Upcoming drama television series
Upcoming Netflix original programming